The 2022 Texas A&M–Corpus Christi Islanders softball team represented Texas A&M University–Corpus Christi during the 2022 NCAA Division I softball season. The Islanders played their home games at the softball facility at Chapman Field and were led by first-year head coach Kathleen Rodriguez. They were members of the Southland Conference.

Preseason

Southland Conference Coaches Poll
The Southland Conference Coaches Poll was released on February 4, 2022. Texas A&M–Corpus Christi was picked to finish sixth in the Southland Conference with 82 votes.

Preseason All-Southland team

First Team
Caitlyn Brockway (HBU, JR, 1st Base)
Cayla Jones (NSU, SR, 2nd Base)
Lindsey Rizzo (SELA, SR, 3rd Base)
Ashleigh Sgambelluri (TAMUCC, JR, Shortstop)
Chloe Gomez (MCNS, SO, Catcher)
Kaylee Lopez (MCNS, JR, Designated Player)
Jil Poullard (MCNS, SO, Outfielder)
Audrey Greely (SELA, SO, Outfielder)
Aeriyl Mass (SELA, SR, Outfielder)
Pal Egan (TAMUCC, JR, Outfielder)
Lyndie Swanson (HBU, R-FR, Pitcher)
Whitney Tate (MCNS, SO, Pitcher)
Jasie Roberts (HBU, R-FR, Utility)

Second Team
Haley Moore (TAMUCC, SO, 1st Base)
Shelby Echols (HBU, SO, 2nd Base)
Autumn Sydlik (HBU, JR, 3rd Base)
Keely DuBois (NSU, SO, Shortstop)
Bailey Krolczyk (SELA, SO, Catcher)
Lexi Johnson (SELA, SO, Designated Player)
Toni Perrin (MCNS, SR, Outfielder)
Cam Goodman (SELA, SO, Outfielder)
Alexandria Torres (TAMUCC, SO, Outfielder)
Ashley Vallejo (MCNS, SO, Pitcher)
Heather Zumo (SELA, SR, Pitcher)
Beatriz Lara (TAMUCC, JR, Pitcher)
Melise Gossen (NICH, JR, Utility)

Personnel

Schedule and results

Schedule Source:
*Rankings are based on the team's current ranking in the NFCA/USA Softball poll.

References

Texas AandM-Corpus Christi
Texas A&M–Corpus Christi Islanders softball
Texas AandM-Corpus Christi Islanders softball